Ethyl salicylate is the ester formed by the condensation of salicylic acid and ethanol.  It is a clear liquid that is sparingly soluble in water, but soluble in alcohol and ether.  It has a pleasant odor resembling wintergreen and is used in perfumery and artificial flavors.

See also
Methyl salicylate
Isopropyl salicylate

References

Flavors
Perfume ingredients
Ethyl esters
Salicylate esters
3-Hydroxypropenals